ESO 269-57 is a large spiral galaxy located about 150 million light-years away in the constellation Centaurus. ESO 269-57 has a diameter of about 200,000 light-years. It is part of group of galaxies known as LGG 342. which is also known as the NGC 5064 Group which is part of the Centaurus Supercluster.

Physical characteristics
ESO 269-57 has an inner ring surrounding its bright center. The ring is made up of several tightly wound spiral arms. Surrounding the inner ring, there are two outer arms which are made up of star-forming regions that appear to split into several branches of arms.

SN1992K
On March 3, 1992 a type Ia supernova was discovered in ESO 269-57.

See also 
 List of spiral galaxies
 NGC 1291

References

External links 

Spiral galaxies
Centaurus (constellation)
45683
269-57
Ring galaxies
Hydra-Centaurus Supercluster